Trenton Boykin (born November 13, 1970) is an American football coach and former player. He is  the running backs coach at the University of Akron.  Boykin served as the head football coach at Lane College in Jackson, Tennessee from 2008 to 2009, compiling a record of 4–17.

Boykin was a wide receiver at Youngstown State University, where he was a member of three NCAA Division I–AA national Championship teams.

Head coaching record

References

1970 births
Living people
American football wide receivers
Akron Zips football coaches
Ball State Cardinals football coaches
Boston College Eagles football coaches
Kentucky State Thorobreds football coaches
Lambuth Eagles football coaches
Lane Dragons football coaches
Tiffin Dragons football coaches
Youngstown State Penguins football coaches
Youngstown State Penguins football players